Jens Carlowitz (born 8 August 1964 in Karl-Marx-Stadt) is a retired East German sprinter.

His personal best time was 44.86 seconds, achieved at the 1989 World Cup in Barcelona. This places him seventh on the German all-time list, behind Thomas Schönlebe, Erwin Skamrahl, Ingo Schultz, Karl Honz, Hartmut Weber and Mathias Schersing.

Carlowitz represented the sports club SC Karl-Marx-Stadt.

Achievements

References

1964 births
Living people
Sportspeople from Chemnitz
People from Bezirk Karl-Marx-Stadt
German male sprinters
East German male sprinters
Olympic athletes of East Germany
Athletes (track and field) at the 1988 Summer Olympics
European Athletics Championships medalists
World Athletics Championships athletes for Germany
World Athletics Indoor Championships winners
Friendship Games medalists in athletics